Denton is a town in Davidson County, North Carolina, United States. The population was 1,636 at the 2010 census.

Geography
Denton is located in southern Davidson County at  (35.632752, -80.111603).

Climate

Demographics

2020 census

As of the 2020 United States census, there were 1,494 people, 671 households, and 403 families residing in the town.

2010 census
As of the census of 2010, there were 1,636 people. The population density was 821.5 people per square mile (316.3/km2). There were 651 housing units at an average density of 368.8 per square mile (142.0/km2). The racial makeup of the town was 98.07% White, 0.62% African American, 0.34% Asian, 0.34% from other races, and 0.62% from two or more races. Hispanic or Latino of any race were 2.00% of the population.

There were 595 households, out of which 34.1% had children under the age of 18 living with them, 51.8% were married couples living together, 11.8% had a female householder with no husband present, and 30.9% were non-families. 26.2% of all households were made up of individuals, and 11.9% had someone living alone who was 65 years of age or older. The average household size was 2.44 and the average family size was 2.89.

In the town, the population was spread out, with 25.9% under the age of 18, 6.6% from 18 to 24, 33.3% from 25 to 44, 19.7% from 45 to 64, and 14.4% who were 65 years of age or older. The median age was 36 years. For every 100 females, there were 90.8 males. For every 100 females age 18 and over, there were 88.1 males.

The median income for a household in the town was $30,950, and the median income for a family was $40,375. Males had a median income of $28,571 versus $21,354 for females. The per capita income for the town was $19,439. About 11.2% of families and 14.4% of the population were below the poverty line, including 23.1% of those under age 18 and 10.5% of those age 65 or over.

History
The founding of Denton may be dated from the time the place acquired a post office, began to be called "Denton" and ceased to be "Finch's Cross Road". The General Assembly passed a bill incorporating the town of Denton on March 11, 1907. The town had its first mayor, J.E. Varner, in 1907, with B.I. Harrison, Arthur E. Davis, J.M. Daniel, L.A. Newsom and Jesse C. Morris as town commissioners. Abel Anderson was the town physician, and John F. Carroll as the chief of police.

The Adderton - Badgett House, Chapel Hill Church Tabernacle, Mor-Val Hosiery Mill, and Mount Ebal Methodist Protestant Church are listed on the National Register of Historic Places.

The Southeast Old Threshers' Reunion, described as "the largest antique tractor and engine show in the Southeast", takes place during the July 4 holiday at Denton FarmPark, a historical park with several restored buildings. A one-day event with airplane rides later expanded to include displays of farm equipment to give people something to do while they waited. As of the 48th annual event in 2018, over 50,000 attended from 20 states, and the five-day event includes 125 vendors, train and helicopter rides, musical performances and fireworks. The primary purpose is to teach people, especially children, about the history of agriculture. Lawn and garden equipment was added in 2018.

Education
Denton has two area elementary schools; Denton Elementary and Silver Valley Elementary. Silver Valley is the smallest elementary school in the Davidson County Schools system, having just under 275 students. Denton Elementary is almost twice the size of Silver Valley, with about 460 children. Both schools feed into South Davidson Middle School, which lies just a mile north of the Denton town limits. South Davidson Middle has just under 395 students. The middle school feeds into the adjoined high school, South Davidson High School. South Davidson is the smallest high school in Davidson County with 413 students at the 2011-2012 school year. The closest college to Denton is Davidson County Community College, a two-year college in northern Davidson County. The closest four-year college is Pfeiffer University, located 19 miles south, near Richfield.

Notable people 
Furman Bisher, sportswriter
Max Lanier, baseball player
Buren Skeen, NASCAR driver who was killed in an accident during the 1965 Darlington Southern 500

References

External links
 Denton Official Website
 Denton NC Unofficial site, History, Photos and Centennial site
 www.ourstate.com/denton

1907 establishments in North Carolina
Populated places established in 1907
Towns in Davidson County, North Carolina
Towns in North Carolina